Vítězslav Tuma (born 4 July 1971) is a Czech former professional footballer who played as a forward. Besides the Czech Republic, he has played in Malaysia.

Tuma played at a position of forward, being a prolific goalscorer. He was a top goalscorer of Czech First League in the 2000–01 season with 15 goals.

References

External links 
 

1971 births
Living people
Sportspeople from Nový Jičín
Association football forwards
Czech footballers
FC Baník Ostrava players
MFK Vítkovice players
AC Sparta Prague players
SK Sigma Olomouc players
1. FK Příbram players
Sabah F.C. (Malaysia) players
Czech First League players
FK Drnovice players
1. SK Prostějov players